Fazal Subhan (born 1 January 1988) is a Pakistani cricketer. He made his Twenty20 debut on 8 September 2016 for Karachi Blues in the 2016–17 National T20 Cup.

References

External links
 

1988 births
Living people
Pakistani cricketers
Karachi Blues cricketers
Karachi Dolphins cricketers
Cricketers from Karachi